Šou počinje u ponoć (trans. The Show Begins at Midnight) is the eight studio album from Serbian rock band Bajaga i Instruktori, released in 2005.

The album featured numerous guests: Negative vocalist Ivana Pavlović on vocals in the song "Fanki taksi", Bebi Dol on vocals in "Bademi i so" and "Pesma slobode", Marko Đorđević on horns, Orthodox Celts member Ana Đokić on violin, the band Vrelo, and folk singer Vida Pavlović, who died before the album release, in the song "Padaj kišo, keve ti". The song "Pesma slobode" is a Serbian language cover of Bob Marley & The Wailers' "Redemption Song".

Track listing
All songs written by Momčilo Bajagić, except where noted.
"Kap po kap" – 4:06
"Fanki taksi" – 4:03
"Bademi i so" – 3:35
"Šou počinje u ponoć" – 3:33
"Pod jasenom" (Žika Milenković, M. Bajagić) - 5:40
"Padaj kišo, keve ti" – 4:26
"Otrov" – 2:51
"Ima svet kraja dva" – 4:03
"Pesma slobode" (B. Marley, M. Bajagić) – 4:20

Personnel
Momčilo Bajagić - vocals, guitar
Žika Milenković - vocals, guitar
Miroslav Cvetković - bass guitar, backing vocals
Saša Lokner - keyboards, backing vocals
Ljubiša Opačić - guitar, backing vocals
Čeda Macura - drums, backing vocals

Additional personnel
Ivana Pavlović - vocals (on track 2)
Bebi Dol - vocals (on tracks: 3, 9)
Vida Pavlović - vocals (on track 6)
Mirna Savić - vocals (on track 7)
Tamara Aralica - vocals (on track 7)
Vrelo - choir (on track 5)
Marjana Popović - backing vocals (on track 6)
Marina Popović - backing vocals (on track 6)
Marko Đorđević - horns (on track 4)
Ana Đokić - violin (on track 9)
Vojislav Aralica - producer, arranged by, programming by, guitar
Goran Kostić - recorded by, programming

References 

Šou počinje u ponoć at Discogs
 EX YU ROCK enciklopedija 1960-2006,  Janjatović Petar;

External links 
Šou počinje u ponoć at Discogs

Bajaga i Instruktori albums
2005 albums
PGP-RTS albums